Route 24, or Highway 24, can refer to:

International
 European route E24

Australia
 Lyell Highway (Tasmania)
 Central Arnhem Road, NT

Austria
 Verbindungsspange Rothneusiedel

Canada
 Alberta Highway 24
 British Columbia Highway 24
 Manitoba Highway 24
 Ontario Highway 24
 Prince Edward Island Route 24
 Saskatchewan Highway 24

Czech Republic
 part of  I/24 Highway; Czech: Silnice I/24

India
  National Highway 24 (India)

Iran

Ireland
  N24 road (Ireland)

Italy
 Autostrada A24

Japan
 Japan National Route 24
 Keinawa Expressway

Korea, South
 National Route 24

New Zealand
 New Zealand State Highway 24

United Kingdom
 British A24 (Worthing-London)

United States
 Interstate 24
 Interstate 24W (former proposal)
 U.S. Route 24
 New England Interstate Route 24 (former)
 Alabama State Route 24
 Arizona State Route 24
 Arkansas Highway 24
 California State Route 24
 County Route A24 (California)
 County Route J24 (California)
 County Route S24 (California)
 Delaware Route 24
 Florida State Road 24
 County Road 24 (Levy County, Florida)
 County Road 24B (Levy County, Florida)
 Georgia State Route 24
 Idaho State Highway 24
 Illinois Route 24 (former)
 Iowa Highway 24
 Kentucky Route 24 (former)
 Louisiana Highway 24
 Maine State Route 24
 Maryland Route 24
Maryland Route 24D
Maryland Route 24E
Maryland Route 24F
 Massachusetts Route 24
 M-24 (Michigan highway)
 Minnesota State Highway 24
 County Road 24 (Goodhue County, Minnesota)
 Mississippi Highway 24
Missouri Route 24 (1922) (former)
 Montana Highway 24
 Nebraska Highway 24
 Nebraska Link 24B
 Nebraska Link 24D
 Nebraska Spur 24C
 Nevada State Route 24 (former)
 New Jersey Route 24
 County Route 24 (Monmouth County, New Jersey)
 New Mexico State Road 24
 New York State Route 24
 County Route 24 (Allegany County, New York)
 County Route 24 (Cattaraugus County, New York)
 County Route 24 (Chemung County, New York)
 County Route 24 (Clinton County, New York)
 County Route 24 (Dutchess County, New York)
 County Route 24 (Montgomery County, New York)
 County Route 24 (Niagara County, New York)
 County Route 24 (Onondaga County, New York)
 County Route 24 (Ontario County, New York)
 County Route 24 (Oswego County, New York)
 County Route 24 (Putnam County, New York)
 County Route 24 (Schenectady County, New York)
 County Route 24 (Schoharie County, New York)
 County Route 24 (Schuyler County, New York)
 County Route 24 (St. Lawrence County, New York)
 County Route 24 (Steuben County, New York)
 County Route 24 (Suffolk County, New York)
 County Route 24 (Sullivan County, New York)
 County Route 24 (Ulster County, New York)
 County Route 24 (Washington County, New York)
 County Route 24 (Westchester County, New York)
 North Carolina Highway 24
 North Dakota Highway 24
 Ohio State Route 24 (1923-1927) (former)
 Oklahoma State Highway 24
Oregon Highway 24 (former)
 Pennsylvania Route 24
 Rhode Island Route 24
 South Carolina Highway 24
 South Dakota Highway 24 (former)
 Tennessee State Route 24
 Texas State Highway 24
 Texas State Highway Spur 24
 Farm to Market Road 24
 Texas Park Road 24
 Utah State Route 24
 Virginia State Route 24
 State Route 24 (Virginia 1918-1933) (former)
 Washington State Route 24
 West Virginia Route 24
 Wisconsin Highway 24
 Wyoming Highway 24
Territories
 Puerto Rico Highway 24

See also
List of A24 roads
List of N24 roads
List of highways numbered 24A